Thank You Berty is a 2010 Sinhalese language Sri Lankan action comedy film written by Tennyson Cooray as his directorial debut and starring a number of Sri Lankan comedians, including Bandu Samarasinghe, Dilhani Ekanayake, Ananda Wickramage, Mahendra Perera, Anusha Damayanthi, Nilanthi Dias, and Cletus Mendis. The film had its world premiere August 7, 2010, in Melbourne, Australia.

Plot
Berty the middle aged bachelor’s life changes when he meets Sanda a nursery school teacher, who hails from a very rich family. Falls madly in love with her, Berty’s attempt to actualise this one sided love is the plot to the play.

Berty’s best friend Norty is married to Matilda. Being a father of 9 children, Norty always attempts to make easy money and when Berty confides his secret love the latter advices him to get rich to win the girls heart and invites him to join him in the journey of making quick and easy money.

Berty and Norty in their journey to make easy money brings fits of laughter during the incidents they encounters.

Cast
 Tennyson Cooray as Birty 
 Bandu Samarasinghe as Norty
 Dilhani Ekanayake as Harry's Daughter
 Anton Jude as Minister
 Ananda Wickramage as Mr. Harry 
 Mahendra Perera as William Silancer, Sanda's Father
 Nilanthi Dias as Sandakomali
 Ronnie Leitch as Munidasa, Driver of Sanda's Father
 Priyankara Perera as Norty's Student
 Susila Kottage as Berty's Mother
 Anusha Damayanthi as Matilda, Norty's Wife
 Cletus Mendis as Police Inspector
 Manel Wanaguru as Opal
 Wimal Kumara de Costa as Security officer
 Ariyasena Gamage as Solbari
 Samanthi Lanerolle as Tamil servant
 Susila Kuragama as Kuri
 Premadasa Vithanage as Opal's Husband
 Rajitha Hiran
 Jeevan Handuneththi
 Mahinda Pathirage as SMS Reality show promoter
 Don Guy as Police Officer
 Teddy Vidyalankara
 Janesh de Silva as Police Constable 
 Chathura Perera as Police Constable
 Kapila Sigera as Chandana, Silancer's servant

Tracklisting
Composed by Somapala Rathnayake. Singers are Sangeeth Wijesuriya and Uresha Ravihari.
Chuttan Battichchi - Sangeeth Wijesuriya, Uresha Ravihari

References

External links
  as archived January 6, 2014

2010 films
2010 action comedy films
2010s Sinhala-language films
Films shot in Sri Lanka